Laurent Mayaba D'Jaffo (born 5 November 1970) is a retired Beninese football player.

D'Jaffo was born in France but moved to Africa at the two years old.  He moved back to France when he was fourteen where he signed with Montpellier at age sixteen.

D'Jaffo has also played for Mansfield (where he scored on his debut against Hull City), Aberdeen, Ayr United, Bury, Stockport County and Sheffield United. D'Jaffo since retired and is now working as a football agent, assisting Sheffield United with their scouting.

International
D'Jaffo was part of the Benin squad at the 2004 African Nations Cup.

Honours
Coupe de la Ligue 1992 with Montpellier HSC

References

External links

1970 births
Living people
Sportspeople from Gironde
Aberdeen F.C. players
Ayr United F.C. players
Citizens of Benin through descent
Benin international footballers
Beninese expatriate footballers
Beninese expatriate sportspeople in Scotland
Beninese expatriate sportspeople in England
Beninese footballers
Bury F.C. players
Chamois Niortais F.C. players
Association football forwards
French expatriate footballers
Expatriate footballers in Scotland
Expatriate footballers in England
French footballers 
French sportspeople of Beninese descent
Mansfield Town F.C. players
Montpellier HSC players
Sheffield United F.C. players
Stockport County F.C. players
Scottish Premier League players
English Football League players
Ligue 1 players
2004 African Cup of Nations players
Footballers from Nouvelle-Aquitaine
Black French sportspeople